Yoo Ye-bin (born January 30, 1992) is a South Korean beauty pageant titleholder who was crowned Miss Korea 2013 and represented her country at the Miss Universe 2014 pageant.

Early life
Yoo Ye-bin was born in Daegu, South Korea and currently is an undergraduate student majoring in textiles at Gyeongsang National University.

Pageantry

Miss Korea 2013
Yoo Ye-bin was crowned Miss Korea 2013 or ″Miss Universe Korea 2014″ during the Miss Korea 2013 competition held June 4.

Miss Universe 2014
Yoo Ye-bin represented Korea at Miss Universe 2014, but was Unplaced.

Acting career
In September 2018, Yoo signed an exclusive management deal with People Story Company.

Filmography
 Player (OCN, 2018) as Cho Yeon-hee

References

External links

 Miss Daegu 2013 profile
 Miss Korea 2013 profile
 Miss Universe 2014 profile

1992 births
Living people
Miss Korea winners
People from Daegu
Miss Universe 2014 contestants
Gyeongsang National University alumni